Claussen is a surname. Notable people with the surname include:

Athletes
Brandon Claussen (born 1979), American baseball player
Georg Claussen (1895–1967), Danish cyclist
Hans Claussen (1911-2001), German weightlifter

Artists
Amalie Claussen (1859–1950), Danish photographer
Gro Pedersen Claussen (born 1941), Norwegian graphic designer
James Claussen, American lithographer and painter
Sophus Claussen (1865–1931), Danish poet

Performers
Frank Claussen (born 1976), Norwegian guitarist
Julia Claussen (1879–1941), Swedish mezzo-soprano

Political figures
Andreas Claussen (1883–1957), Norwegian barrister, civil servant and politician
Eileen Claussen (born 1945), President of the Center for Climate and Energy Solutions
George C. Claussen (1882–1948), Justice of the Iowa Supreme Court
Otto Claussen Iberri (born 1964), Mexican politician

Religious leaders
Geoffrey Claussen, American rabbi

Scientists
Claus-Frenz Claussen (born 1939), German neurotologist
Peter Claussen (fl. nineteenth century, dates unclear), also known as Pedro Cláudio Dinamarquez (Peter) Clausen, Danish natural history collector

Businesses
Claussen pickles
Claussen and Claussen, architecture firm

Sites
 Claussen's Bakery, historic site
 Claussen House, historic site in Florence, South Carolina
 William Claussen House, historic site in Davenport, Iowa